Easin' It is a studio album by Count Basie and his orchestra recorded between 1960 and 1962. The album contains a collaboration by Frank Foster, a well known member from Basie's big band. All tracks were composed, arranged and conducted by Foster and is a mixture of jazz and blues.

The tune Easin' It became a great success for Basie those years. It was one of the most performed tunes in his concerts in the early 60's.

Track listing 
 Easin' It - 6:12
 Brotherly Shove - 3:17
 Blues for Daddy-O - 8:56
 Four, Five, Six - 4:40
 Misunderstood Blues - 6:05
 Mama Dev Blues - 4:44
 It's About That Time - 4:17

All compositions by Frank Foster

Personnel
The Count Basie Orchestra
Count Basie - piano
Freddie Green - guitar
Eddie Jones - bass - (tracks 1–3)
Sonny Payne - drums - (tracks 1–3)
Snooky Young - trumpet - (tracks 1–3)
Thad Jones - trumpet
Sonny Cohn - trumpet
Joe Newman - trumpet - (tracks 1–3)
Clark Terry - trumpet - (tracks 1–3)
Al Grey - trombone - (tracks 1–3)
Henry Coker - trombone
Benny Powell - trombone
Marshal Royal - alto sax, clarinet
Frank Wess - alto sax, tenor sax, flute
Frank Foster - tenor sax, arranger, conductor
Billy Mitchell - tenor sax - (tracks 1–3)
Charlie Fowlkes - baritone sax
Art Davis - bass - (track 4)
Gus Johnson - drums - (track 4)
Flip Ricard - trumpet - (tracks 4–7)
Al Aarons - trumpet - (tracks 4–7)
Eric Dixon - tenor sax, flute - (tracks 4–7)
Ike Isaacs - bass - (tracks 5–7)
Louis Bellson - drums - (tracks 5–7)
Quentin Jackson - trombone - (tracks 4–7)

References

1962 albums
Count Basie Orchestra albums
Roulette Records albums